Boink!!  is a rare 1986 album by The Replacements. It was released in the UK on Glass Records.

The album contains songs previously released on the album Hootenany and the EP Stink. Also on the album are "If Only You Were Lonely" (B-Side of the "I'm in Trouble" single) and a previously unreleased track titled "Nowhere Is My Home," produced by Alex Chilton.

Track listing
"Color Me Impressed" – 2:26
"White and Lazy" – 2:06
"Within Your Reach" – 4:25
"If Only You Were Lonely" – 2:32
"Kids Don't Follow" – 2:18
"Nowhere Is My Home" – 4:08
"Take Me Down to the Hospital" – 3:47
"Go" – 2:28

Personnel
Chris Mars – drums
Bob Stinson – guitar
Tommy Stinson – bass
Paul Westerberg – vocals, guitar

References

1986 compilation albums
The Replacements (band) compilation albums
Glass Records compilation albums